Carolyn Hutchinson (born c. 1968)  is a Scottish curler.

Teams

References

External links
 
 

Scottish female curlers
Scottish curling champions
Living people
1960s births